is a train station in the city of Toyama, Toyama Prefecture, Japan.

Lines

Station layout 
The station has two ground-level opposed side platforms serving two tracks. The station is staffed during weekdays.

Platforms

History
Higashi-Shinjō Station was opened on 15 August 1931.

Passenger statistics
In fiscal 2015, the station was used by 918 passengers daily.

Adjacent stations

Surrounding area 
 Shinjō Elementary School
Japan National Route 41

See also
 List of railway stations in Japan

References

External links

 

Railway stations in Toyama Prefecture
Railway stations in Japan opened in 1931
Stations of Toyama Chihō Railway
Toyama (city)